François Sallé (1839–1899) was a 19th-century French realist painter. He is best known for the painting The Anatomy Class at the Ecole des Beaux-Arts (1888)

19th-century French painters
French male painters
1839 births
1899 deaths
19th-century French male artists